Jai Singh may refer to:
 Jai Singh I (1611–1667), ruler of Amber kingdom in India and a Rajput general of the Mughal Empire; also known as Mirza Raja Jai Singh
 Jai Singh of Mewar (1653–1698), ruler of the Mewar kingdom in India
 Jai Singh II (1688–1743), ruler of Amber kingdom in India; also known as Maharaja Sawai Jai Singh
 Jai Singh III (1819–1835), Maharaja of Jaipur State
 Jai Singh Kanheya (1712–1793), the founder and leader of the Kanheya Misl of India
 Jai Singh Prabhakar (1882–1937), Maharaja of Alwar kingdom in India
 Jai Arjun Singh, New Delhi-based freelance writer/journalist
 Jai Pal Singh (1930–1997), Indian physician and educator
 Jai Pratap Singh (born 1953), Indian politician in the Uttar Pradesh Legislative Assembly 
 Jai Pal Singh (politician), Indian politician in the Uttar Pradesh Legislative Council

See also 
 Jayasimha (disambiguation), another transliteration of the name